Palayam is a village in the Perambalur district, Tamil Nadu, India.

References 

Villages in Perambalur district